The 1930 Nebraska gubernatorial election was held on November 4, 1930, and featured former Governor Charles W. Bryan, a Democrat, narrowly defeating incumbent Republican Governor, Arthur J. Weaver, to win a second two-year, non-consecutive term in office.

Democratic primary

Candidates
Charles W. Bryan, former Governor
Anton H. Jensen

Results

Republican primary

Candidates
Harry O. Palmer, attorney
Arthur J. Weaver, incumbent Governor

Results

General election

Results

References

Gubernatorial
1930
Nebraska
November 1930 events